Bernadine Michelle Bezuidenhout (born 14 September 1993) is a South-African born New Zealand international cricketer who currently plays for Northern Districts. She played for South Africa national women's cricket team between 2014 and 2015 before moving to Christchurch, New Zealand and has since represented the New Zealand White Ferns, after a three-year stand down period. On 6 May 2018, she made her Women's Twenty20 International (WT20I) debut for New Zealand against Ireland.

In August 2018, she was awarded a central contract by New Zealand Cricket, following the tours of Ireland and England in the previous months. In October 2018, she was named in New Zealand's squad for the 2018 ICC Women's World Twenty20 tournament in the West Indies.

References

External links
 

1993 births
Living people
New Zealand women cricketers
New Zealand women One Day International cricketers
New Zealand women Twenty20 International cricketers
South African women cricketers
South Africa women One Day International cricketers
South Africa women Twenty20 International cricketers
Northern Cape women cricketers
Eastern Province women cricketers
South Western Districts women cricketers
Boland women cricketers
Western Province women cricketers
Northern Districts women cricketers
Cricketers from Kimberley, Northern Cape
Dual international cricketers
Wicket-keepers
South African emigrants to New Zealand